22 (twenty-two) is the natural number following 21 and preceding 23.

In mathematics 

22 is a palindromic number and the eighth semiprime; its proper divisors are 1, 2, and 11. It is the second Smith number, the second Erdős–Woods number, and the fourth large Schröder number. It is also a Perrin number, from a sum of 10 and 12.

22 is the fourth pentagonal number, the third hexagonal pyramidal number, and the third centered heptagonal number.

The maximum number of regions into which five intersecting circles divide the plane is 22. 22 is also the quantity of pieces in a disc that can be created with six straight cuts, which makes 22 the seventh central polygonal number.

 is a commonly used approximation of the irrational number , the ratio of the circumference of a circle to its diameter, where in particular 22 and 7 are consecutive hexagonal pyramidal numbers. Also,

 from an approximate construction of the squaring of the circle by Srinivasa Ramanujan, correct to eight decimal places.

22 can read as "two twos", which is the only fixed point of John Conway's look-and-say function. In other words, "22" generates the infinite repeating sequence "22, 22, 22, ..."

All regular polygons with  <  edges can be constructed with an angle trisector, with the exception of the 11-sided hendecagon.

There is an elementary set of twenty-two single-orbit convex tilings that tessellate two-dimensional space with face-transitive, edge-transitive, and/or vertex-transitive properties: eleven of these are regular and semiregular Archimedean tilings, while the other eleven are their dual Laves tilings. Twenty-two edge-to-edge star polygon tilings exist in the second dimension that incorporate regular convex polygons: eighteen involve specific angles, while four involve angles that are adjustable.

There are twenty-two different subgroups that describe full icosahedral symmetry. Three groups are generated by particular inversions, five groups by reflections, and nine  groups by rotations, alongside three mixed groups, the pyritohedral group, and the full icosahedral group.

There are 22 finite semiregular polytopes through the eighth dimension, aside from the infinite families of prisms and antiprisms in the third dimension and inclusive of 2 enantiomorphic forms. Defined as vertex-transitive polytopes with regular facets, there are:
15 Archimedean semiregular solids in 3-space, which include two chiral forms, one from the snub cube and one from the snub dodecahedron. In other words, from symmetries of 13 distinct semiregular polyhedra, two of which have mirror images.
3 semiregular polychora in 4-space: the rectified 5-cell, the rectified 600-cell and the snub 24-cell.
4 semiregular polytopes from 5-space through 8-space that are part of the family of k21 polytopes: the demipenteract, 221, 321, and 421; with the final figure representing the root vectors of simple Lie group E8. The family of k21 polytopes can be extended backward to include the rectified 5-cell and the three-dimensional triangular prism, which is the simplest semiregular polytope.

k22 polytopes are a family of five different polytopes up through the eighth dimension, that include three finite polytopes and two honeycombs. Its root figure is the first proper duoprism, the 3-3 duoprism (-122), which is made of six triangular prisms. The second figure is the birectified 5-simplex (022), and the last finite figure is the 6th-dimensional 122 polytope. 122 is highly symmetric, whose 72 vertices represent the root vectors of the simple Lie group E6. 322 is a paracompact infinite honeycomb that contains 222 Euclidean honeycomb facets under Coxeter group symmetry , with 222 made of 122 facets, and so forth. The Coxeter symbol for these figures is of the form kij, where each letter represents a length of order-3 branches on a Coxeter–Dynkin diagram with a single ring on the end node of a k-length sequence of branches.

There are twenty-two Coxeter groups in the sixth dimension that generate uniform polytopes: four of these generate uniform non-prismatic figures, while the remaining eighteen generate uniform prisms, duoprisms and triaprisms.

The number 22 appears prominently within sporadic groups. Mathieu group M22 is one of 26 such sporadic finite simple groups, defined as the 3-transitive permutation representation on 22 points. It is the monomial of the McLaughlin sporadic group, McL, and the unique index 2 subgroup of the automorphism group of  Steiner system S(3,6,22). Mathieu group M23 contains M22 as a  point stabilizer, and has a minimal irreducible complex representation in 22 dimensions, like McL. M23 has two rank 3 actions on 253 points, with 253 equal to the sum of the first 22 non-zero positive integers, or the 22nd triangular number. Both M22 and M23 are maximal subgroups within Mathieu group M24, which works inside the lexicographic generation of Steiner system S(5,8,24) W24, where single elements within 759 octads of 24-element sets occur 253 times throughout its entire set. On the other hand, the Higman–Sims sporadic group HS  also has a minimal faithful complex representation in 22 dimensions, and is equal to 100 times the group order of M22, . Conway group Co1 and Fischer group Fi24 both have 22 different conjugacy classes.

The extended binary Golay code , which is related to Steiner system W24, is constructed as a vector space of F2 from the words:

 and 

The extended ternary Golay code [12, 6, 6], whose root is the ternary Golay code [11, 6, 5] over F3, has a complete weight enumerator value equal to:

The 22nd unique prime in base ten is notable for having starkly different digits compared to its preceding (and latter) unique primes, as well as for the similarity of its digits to those of the reciprocal of 7  Being 84 digits long with a period length of 294 digits, it is the number:

In science 
22 is the atomic number of titanium.
22 is the number of bones in the human skull: 14 belong to the facial skeleton and 8 to the neurocranium.

In aircraft 
22 is the designation of the USAF stealth fighter, the F-22 Raptor.

In art, entertainment, and media

In music 
 "Twenty Two" is a song by:
 Karma to Burn (2007)
 The Vicar (2013)
 Jordan Sweeney (2008)
 The Good Life (2000)
 Sweet Nectar (1996)
 American Generals (2004)
 Dan Anderson (2007)
 Bad Cash Quartet (2006)
 Millencolin (1999)
 Enter the Worship Circle (2005)
 Blank Dogs (2008)
 Al Candello (2002)
 Amen Dunes (2018)
In Jay-Z's song "22 Two's", he rhymes the words: too, to, and two, 22 times in the first verse.
"22 Acacia Avenue" is a song by Iron Maiden on the album The Number of the Beast.
Catch 22 is an album by death metal band Hypocrisy.
"22" is a song by Lily Allen on the album It's Not Me, It's You.
22 Dreams is a song and album by Paul Weller. The album has 22 songs on it.
The Norwegian electronica project Ugress uses 22 as a recurring theme. All four albums feature a track with 22 in the title.
"22" is a song by Taylor Swift on her fourth album Red.
"The Number 22" is a song by Ashbury Heights on the album The Looking Glass Society.
22, A Million is an album by Bon Iver. The first track of the album is called "22 (OVER SOON)".
Cubic 22 was a Belgian techno duo.
"22" is a song by the English alternative rock band Deaf Havana on their album Old Souls.
"22" is a song by the Irish singer Sarah McTernan. She represented Ireland with this song at Eurovision 2019.

In other fields 
Catch-22 (1961), Joseph Heller's novel, and its 1970 film adaptation gave rise to the expression of logic "catch-22".
Revista 22 is a magazine published in Romania.
There are 22 stars in the Paramount Pictures logo.
"Twenty Two" (February 10, 1961) is Season 2–episode 17 (February 10, 1961) of the 1959–1964 TV series The Twilight Zone, in which a hospitalized dancer has nightmares about a sinister nurse inviting her to Room 22, the hospital morgue.
Traditional Tarot decks have 22 cards with allegorical subjects. These serve as trump cards in the game. The Fool is usually a kind of wild-card among the trumps and unnumbered, so the highest trump is numbered 21. Occult Tarot decks usually have 22 similar cards which are called Major Arcana by fortune-tellers. Occultists have related this number to the 22 letters of the Hebrew alphabet and the 22 paths in the Kabbalistic Tree of Life.
 "22" is the number assigned to the unborn soul who serves as a prominent character in the Pixar film Soul.

In computing and technology 
22 is the standard port number for the Secure Shell protocol.

In culture and religion 
There are 22 letters in the Hebrew alphabet.
In the Kabbalah, there are 22 paths between the Sephirot.
22 is a master number in numerology.

In sports 
In both American football and association football, a total of 22 players (counting both teams) start the game, and this is also the maximum number of players that can be legally involved in play at any given time.
In men's Australian rules football, each team is allowed a squad of 22 players (18 on the field and 4 interchanges).
The length of a cricket pitch is 22 yards.
In rugby union, the "22" is a line in each half of the field which is 22 meters from the respective try line. It has significance in a number of laws particularly relating to kicking the ball away.
 A snooker game (called a "frame") starts with 22 coloured balls at specified locations on the table (15 red balls and 7 others).

In weights and measures 
The number of yards in a chain.

In other uses 
Twenty-two may also refer to:
 22 is the number of the French department Côtes-d'Armor
 "22" is a common name for the .22 calibre .22 Long Rifle cartridge.
In French jargon, "22" is used as a phrase to warn of the coming of the police (typically "22, v'là les flics !" (In English: "5-0! Cops!")
 In photography, f/22 is the largest f-stop (and thus smallest aperture) available on most lenses made for single-lens reflex cameras
 In Spanish lottery and bingo, 22 is nicknamed  after its shape.

See also 
Catch 22 (disambiguation)
List of highways numbered 22
Synchronicity

References

External links 

 

Integers